The Battle of Keresztes (also known as the Battle of Mezőkeresztes) took place on 24–26 October 1596. It was fought between a combined Habsburg-Transylvanian force and the Ottoman Empire near the village of Mezőkeresztes in modern-day northern Hungary. The Ottomans routed the Habsburg-led army but due to their own losses are unable to exploit their victory.

Background
On 23 June 1596, an Ottoman Army marched from Constantinopole. Commanded by Sultan Mehmed III, the army marched through Edirne, Filibe (now known as Plovdiv), Sofia, and Niš to arrive at Belgrade on 9 August. On 20 August, the army crossed the River Sava by bridge and entered the Austrian territory of Siren. A war council was called at Slankamen Castle, and it was decided that they would begin a siege on the Hungarian fort of Eger (Erlau). The fort controlled the communication routes between Habsburg Austria and Transylvania, all of whom were in revolt against Ottoman suzerainty.

However, news soon arrived that the Austrians had besieged and succeeded in taking over the Castle of Hatvan and had brutally killed all the Ottomans housed there, including the women and children. The Ottoman Army started a siege of the fort of Eger on 21 September 1596, and by 12 October the castle had capitulated. As retaliation for the Hatvan castle massacre, the defenders of the castle were all executed.

Not long after, Ottoman command received the report that a mixed army of Austrians and Transylvanians were advancing towards the Ottoman expeditionary force. A war council in the castle of Hatvan was conducted under Grand Vizier Damat Ibrahim Pasha. It was decided that the Ottoman army should march out of Erlau castle so as to meet the Austrians at a suitable battle terrain. The Sultan thought that the Ottoman army should disengage and return to Istanbul; it was with great difficulty that he was persuaded to engage the enemy forces. The Christian army had 10,000 Austrians, 4,000 Germans, 3,000 reiters, 13,000 Hungarian light cavalry and 10,000 Transylvanians, plus 15 other European countries for a total of 55,000 men.

Battle
The Ottoman army marched through several passageways of marshy terrain and reached Haçova (Turkish meaning: Plain of the Cross), exhausted after a long siege and a hard, long march. The two armies faced each other on the plains of Haçova. The Austrian-Transylvanian army, under the joint command of Archduke Maximillian III of Austria and Prince Sigismund Bathory of Transylvania, was in position in fortified trenches. When the Ottoman army attacked the Austrian trenches, the Battle of Haçova commenced and continued for two days, from 25 to 26 October 1596. Early firearms (cannons, muskets) were used extensively in the battle. The Austrians, being entrenched around the old ruined church, succeeded in driving back the Ottoman assaults with a barrage of fire from muskets and 100 cannon.

By the second day of battle the Ottoman army appeared to have been defeated. According to the 17th Century Ottoman historian İbrahim Peçevi:
"The Christians broke through the Ottoman army, but the soldiers of Islam had not yet felt the defeat. Then, they started to plunder and taking of booty at the command headquarters of the Ottomans. Under a few flags, a large group of Christian soldiers attacked the tent where the chests of gold money of the Ottoman Exchequer were kept. They killed and otherwise eliminated the Janissary and household cavalry soldiers guarding the State Treasury. The Christian soldiers got on the Treasury chests of gold coin and put up their flags of cross over them and started to dance around them."

Commander Sultan Mehmed III wanted to flee from the battlefield. However, first he asked for the opinion of his tutor, the high cleric Hoca Sadeddin Efendi, who told the Sultan that he should continue the battle till the end. Heeding this advice, Sultan Mehmed III ordered that the battle should continue.

On the second day of the battle, the fighting intensified. Troops from the Austrian army had reached the Sultan's tent, which was surrounded by the viziers and the teachers at the Palace Pages School for protection. While some troops were trying to enter the Sultan's tent, the other Austrian army's soldiers disengaged, in search of booty and plunder instead of continuing the engagement. The Ottoman horse groomers, cooks, tent makers, and camels minders retaliated against the plunderers with whatever arms they could find, including cooks' spoons, blocks of wood, hammers for tent making, adzes, and axes for cutting wood. The Austrians were surprised and retreated in confusion. The cries of "the Christian enemy is fleeing" were heard by the Ottoman troops still fighting what seemed like a losing battle on the frontline. The boost of morale allowed them to recover the battle. With a major action from the Ottoman artillery cannons, the Ottoman forces started another attack on the Austrians across the front and the remaining Ottoman cavalry outflanked the Austrian-Transylvanian army, routing them.

Aftermath

Soon after victory, Mehmed III appointed Cigalazade Yusuf Sinan Pasha as the new Grand Vizier. He sent an imperial victory proclamation to Istanbul giving the news of the conquering of Eger (Erlau) Castle and the victory at the Battle of Haçova (Keresztes). This reached Istanbul in October and there were public celebrations and public meetings organized in the city. During these celebrations, four galleys full of state-procured sugar from Egypt arrived at Istanbul harbor, which added  "sweetness" to the news of a military victory. Mehmed III was awarded the epithet of 'Conqueror of Egri'.

The Sultan's army marched for a month, returning to Istanbul victorious. Mehmed III returned to Istanbul in November to a triumphal reception. His victory at Keresztes had turned him into a hero. The imperial Ottoman Army returned to Istanbul victorious and were greeted happily by the residents of Istanbul. With the army in place, a great victory procession and many accompanying spectacles were carried out. The poets of Istanbul wrote special works about the victory. In the streets and markets of the city, town-criers were sent to announce that the streets of the city would be decorated to celebrate the great victory. Mehmed III wanted to celebrate this victory with great splendour. The warehouses and stores were all decorated with 'valuable cloths'. This display of colour all across the city is described in a poem by the poet [Kemal]:

"All the shops of the city became colored due to conqueror sultan's wishes

Each of which were decorated as if it were the kerchief of the sweetheart"

Casualties
The Christians lost 12,000, 23,000 or 30,000 men, while the Ottomans suffered 20,000–30,000 casualties.

Notes

References 

 

 George C. Kohn, Dictionary of wars, Infobase Publishing, 2007
  Article in History Today, "Last-minute Turkish victory at Keresztes".
 Battle of Mezőkeresztes (Hungarian)
 Sakaoglu, Necdet [1999], Bu Mulkun Sultanlari (Sultans of this realm), Istanbul:Oglak. .  (Turkish)
 Shaw, Stanford J. [1976] History of the Ottoman Empire and Modern Turkey: Vol.1 Empire of the Gazis, Cambridge University Press. .

Conflicts in 1596
Keresztes
Keresztes
Keresztes
Keresztes
Keresztes
Keresztes
Military history of Hungary
1596 in Europe
Keresztes
Battles of the Long Turkish War
History of Borsod-Abaúj-Zemplén County